Elpinice ( Elpiniki, flourished c. 450 BC ancient Greece) was a noblewoman of classical Athens.

She was the daughter of Miltiades, tyrant of the Greek colonies on the Thracian Chersonese, and half sister of Cimon, an important Athenian political figure. She is known from  Plutarch's life of Pericles, where she appears twice in political confrontations with the Athenian statesman.

Greek law allowed marriage between a brother and sister if they had different mothers. Some accounts say that Elpinice was for a time married to her brother, but was later given as a bride to Callias II, one of the richest men in Athens, who had fallen in love with her.  Callias had made marriage to Elpinice the condition for paying, on Cimon's behalf, the fine which had been imposed upon their father Miltiades and for which Cimon had inherited responsibility.

When Cimon was charged with treason for taking bribes from Alexander I, king of Macedonia, she negotiated his acquittal with Pericles.

When the people of the island of Samos revolted against Athenian rule, Pericles pursued a war against them and punished them by demolishing their city walls, confiscating their ships and forcing them to pay a large fine. Rather than celebrate the victory Elpinice was a lone voice who pointed out that it was won over Athens' own people rather that against her true foreign enemies such as the Phoenicians or Medes. Pericles rebuked her with the words "As an old woman you should not anoint yourself with oils." This dismissed the seriousness of her charge and at the same time implied women's only power lay in their sexuality.

She was a lover to the artist Polygnotus of Thasos who used her features in his work depicting the Trojan woman Laodice.

At her death she was buried with members of her own family by birth and not her husbands.  This suggests a continuing closeness and loyalty with her brother.

References

5th-century BC Athenians
5th-century BC Greek women
Ancient Athenian women